Qaleh Juq-e Siah Mansur (also Romanized as Qal‘eh Jūq-e Sīāh Mansūr) is a village in Qaleh Juq Rural District, Anguran District, Mahneshan County, Zanjan Province, Iran. At the 2006 census, its population was 634, in 166 families.

References 

Populated places in Mahneshan County